Sevylor is a company that makes inflatable boats out of PVC and vinyl.  Founded in France in 1948, it is one of the largest manufacturers of consumer PVC rafts in the world.  In 2004, Sevylor was acquired by National Ventures of Huntington Beach, CA in 2004 and is now based in the United States.

External links
Sevylor Corporation

American boat builders
Companies based in Huntington Beach, California
Inflatable boat manufacturers
2004 mergers and acquisitions
2007 mergers and acquisitions
2016 mergers and acquisitions